The 2021 Erovnuli Liga 2 was the 5th season under its current title and the 33rd season of second tier football in Georgia. The season began on 1 March and ended on 3 December.

Team changes
The following teams have changed division since the 2020 season:

To Erovnuli Liga 2

Promoted from Liga 3

• Gareji Sagarejo

Relegated from Erovnuli Liga

• Chikhura Sachkhere

• Merani Tbilisi

From Erovnuli Liga 2

Promoted to Erovnuli Liga

• Shukura Kobuleti 

• Samgurali Tskaltubo

Relegated to Liga 3

• Aragvi Dusheti

Teams and stadiums

 
Source:

League table

Results

Regular season

Round 1-18

Round 19-36

Relegation play-offs 
First leg 

Second leg

WIT Georgia won 5–3 on aggregate.

Rustavi won on the away goals rule.

Statistics

Top scorers

Hat-tricks

Note: 
 *Player scored 6 goals
 ** Player scored 4 goals
(H) – Home team

(A) – Away team

Clean sheets

Discipline

Player 

Most red cards - 2 

• Beka Kharshiladze (Rustavi)

• Guram Samushia (Gagra)

• Lasha Ugrekhelidze (Sioni)

Club

Most red cards - 4

• Rustavi

Source:

Awards

References

External links
Georgian Football Federation

Erovnuli Liga 2 seasons
2
Georgia
Georgia